Mickaël Antoine-Curier (born 5 March 1983) is a French former professional footballer who played as a striker from 2001 until 2018.

Antoine-Curier played in seven countries for twenty two different sides. In England with Preston North End, Nottingham Forest, Brentford, Oldham Athletic, Rochdale, Kidderminster Harriers, Notts County, Grimsby Town and Burton Albion, In Norway for Vard Haugesund and FK Haugesund, in Scotland with Hibernian, Dundee, Hamilton Academical and Dunfermline Athletic, in Cyprus for Ermis Aradippou and Ethnikos Achnas, in Malaysia for Felda United, in Kazakhstan for FC Atyrau, in Belgium for Union SG and Eendracht Aalst and finally in his native France for FC Mulhouse. Antoine-Curier was capped by the Guadeloupe national team competing in the Caribbean Cup and the CONCACAF Gold Cup.

Early life
Antoine-Curier was born in Orsay, Essonne.

Club career

England
Antoine-Curier began his career as a youth in France with Paris Saint-Germain and Nice. Eager to play in the United Kingdom, he signed for Preston North End and then Nottingham Forest as a youth. He initially played academy football, finish top scorer for the Forest academy team with 22 goals in 19 games. He won the trophy for the academy player of the year and was selected as man of the match of the Charity Vase final by Brian Clough, but he never made it for the first team. During the 2002–03 season, the Forest manager Paul Hart loaned him out to Brentford, where he made 11 starts, scoring three goals. This included a brace in an important 2–0 victory at Chesterfield.

He came to prominence at the start of the 2003–04 season in the third tier of English football, having signed for Oldham Athletic. He grabbed his first cup goal in a 2–1 defeat at Scunthorpe United, then scored his first league goal for the "Latics" four days later in a 2–2 draw at Sheffield Wednesday's Hillsborough Stadium. He grabbed another goal in a 3–2 home defeat to Blackpool the following week. He made a total of six starts and three substitute appearances for the Boundary Park club, scoring three goals, before being released.

Antoine-Curier then joined Kidderminster Harriers, before joining Rochdale on a non-contract basis. He made five starts and five substitute appearances for Rochdale, scoring on his debut in a 1–1 draw at Lincoln City. He then left Rochdale to join Sheffield Wednesday, a club he had scored against earlier on in the season. He made just one substitute appearance for Wednesday, in a 0–0 draw against Luton Town at Hillsborough.

He then joined Notts County, where he made four starts, scoring in a 3–1 win over Grimsby Town, whom he signed for shortly afterwards. He also made five appearances for Grimsby, but could not score. Both Grimsby and Notts County were relegated at the end of the season.

Norway
After an unsettled time in the UK, Curier joined Norwegian First Division side Vard Haugesund in 2004. In his first season, he scored seven goals in 16 appearances, but the club was relegated. He scored 27 goals in 21 games in the 2005 season, winning the Norwegian golden boot and the Norwegian Second Division player of the year award. He then transferred to FK Haugesund, and scored eight goals in 24 appearances in the 2006 season and seven goals in 15 appearances in the 2007 season. His time at Norway was a positive one, where he was nicknamed as Batigol and David Trezeguet.

Scotland
Antoine-Curier was invited by manager John Collins to Scottish Premier League side Hibernian for a trial period in 2007. He starred in a friendly match against First Division side Livingston, scoring four goals in a 5–2 victory. FK Haugesund captain Kevin Nicol, a former Hibernian player, was full of praise for Antoine-Curier, expressing his belief that the French striker "would do really well" if he was signed by Hibs. Curier signed a one-year contract with Hibernian, who paid FK Haugesund a nominal transfer fee, on 31 August 2007. Antoine-Curier scored against Motherwell in the Scottish League Cup and Kilmarnock in the SPL. Despite scoring four goals in nine appearances, Antoine-Curier fell out of favour after Hibs signed Colin Nish.

Curier was loaned by Hibs to Dundee in January 2008. Curier scored six goals in his first four Dundee appearances, including a hat-trick in a 6–1 win over Stirling Albion. On 7 May 2008, Curier signed a three-year deal with Dundee.

Dundee loaned out Antoine-Curier at the end of the 2009 summer transfer window to SPL side Hamilton Academical. Antoine-Curier made his debut against Hibernian in the SPL and marked it with a goal after 12 minutes. On 15 October 2010, Antoine-Curier had his contract terminated by Dundee, a victim of the club entering administration. On 11 January 2011, following a battle with injury, Antoine-Curier re-signed for Hamilton until the end of the season.

Cyprus and further afield
In July 2011 he signed a two-year deal with Cypriot side Ermis Aradippou, however his contract was terminated due to financial difficulties at the club and he joined Ermis' former president and a host of the club's former players at Ethnikos Achnas in August, just days before the 2011–12 season.

In April 2012, he joined Felda United FC with his fellow countryman Eddy Viator. He made his league debut on 8 April 2012, scoring a goal in a 2–0 home win over Kedah FA.

In February 2013, Antoine-Curier joined Kazakhstan Premier League club FC Atyrau. However, his time in Kazakhstan was overshadowed where he was an outcast by his team-mates, spat on by opposing fans and refused accommodation because of the colour of his skin. However, the manager at the time, Miodrag Radulović, denies Antoine-Curier, claiming "he never told me these things while in Atyrau FC."

Return to the UK
He re-signed for Hamilton in August 2013. In the Scottish League Cup, Antoine-Curier scored his first goal, in a 1–0 win over Kilmarnock. After scoring nine goals in the league, Antoine-Curier scored four goals for the first time in his professional career, as Hamilton thrash 10–2 against Greenock Morton in the last game of the season. However, the win did not guarantee automatic promotion to Scottish Premiership after his former club, Dundee, won at the same day. After the match, Antoine-Curier expressed disappointment not to become Champions, though the scoreline showed Hamilton's desire to reach the Scottish Premiership. Antoine-Curier was released from his contract at Hamilton on 2 February 2015, by mutual consent.

Antoine-Curier joined Burton Albion on 18 February 2015, until the end of the 2014–15 season. Antoine-Curier made his Burton Albion debut, where he came on as a substitute for Stuart Beavon in the 88th minute, in a 3–1 win over Dagenham & Redbridge on 21 February 2015. Following Burton Albion's promotion to League One, Antoine-Curier was released after making five appearances.

In August 2015, Antoine-Curer had a trial with Scottish League One team Dunfermline Athletic, subsequently signing for the Scottish League One side in September 2015. Chances with the Pars, however, were limited and after only four months with the club, Antoine-Curier was released.

Later career
Following his release Dunfermline, Antoine-Curier subsequently signed for Belgian Second Division side Royale Union Saint-Gilloise on an 18-month contract. His time with the club was hindered by a recurring knee-injury, and in January 2017 he was loaned out to Belgian Fourth Division side Eendracht Aalst.

In September 2017, Antoine-Curier signed for National 3 side FC Mulhouse on a one-year deal.

Personal life
Antoine-Curier now resides in Belgium where he owns his own chauffeur and VIP transportation company called MAC Transport.

International career
Curier was selected by Guadeloupe for the Caribbean Cup 2008, scoring 6 goals in 8 games. He also participated in the 2009 CONCACAF Gold Cup for Guadeloupe, in which they reached the quarter finals.

Career statistics
Source:

References

External links

Norwegian & International Statistics of Football – Antoine-Curier factfile

 Mickaël Antoine-Curier Interview

1983 births
2009 CONCACAF Gold Cup players
Association football forwards
Brentford F.C. players
Dundee F.C. players
Ethnikos Achna FC players
Expatriate footballers in England
Expatriate footballers in Norway
Expatriate footballers in Scotland
Expatriate footballers in Cyprus
Expatriate footballers in Malaysia
Expatriate footballers in Kazakhstan
FC Atyrau players
FK Haugesund players
French expatriate footballers
French expatriate sportspeople in England
French expatriate sportspeople in Norway
French expatriate sportspeople in Scotland
French footballers
French people of Guadeloupean descent
Grimsby Town F.C. players
Guadeloupe international footballers
Guadeloupean footballers
Guadeloupean expatriate footballers
Hamilton Academical F.C. players
Hibernian F.C. players
Kidderminster Harriers F.C. players
Living people
Malaysia Super League players
Nottingham Forest F.C. players
Notts County F.C. players
OGC Nice players
Oldham Athletic A.F.C. players
Paris Saint-Germain F.C. players
Preston North End F.C. players
Rochdale A.F.C. players
Scottish Premier League players
Sheffield Wednesday F.C. players
Footballers from Essonne
Burton Albion F.C. players
SK Vard Haugesund players
Dunfermline Athletic F.C. players
English Football League players
Scottish Professional Football League players
Cypriot First Division players
Challenger Pro League players